The Woman at the Crossroads may refer to:

 The Woman at the Crossroads (1919 film), German silent film
 The Woman at the Crossroads (1938 film), German film